Eugenia pyriformis is a plant of the family Myrtaceae found primarily in Brazil. It reaches 20 to 45 feet (6 to 13 meters) in height and 1 to 1.5 feet (30-50 centimeters) in trunk diameter. It is a native species of Brazil, occurring primarily in the states of Paraná, Rio Grande do Sul, Santa Catarina and São Paulo.

Cultivation
It may grow between elevations of 1000 to 5000 feet (300 to 1500 meters). It requires a well drained, preferably slightly acid soil.

Fruit
Eugenia pyriformis flowers between the months of August and December, and produces fruit between September and January. The yellow fruit of the plant is called uvalha and is edible. Some environmentalists have recommended use of the plant for projects of reforestation in Brazil, especially in degraded areas and permanent nature preserves. The plant is also popular for ornamental or domestic purposes.

References

Trees of Brazil
Flora of Brazil
pyriformis
Edible fruits